Marei may refer to
Marei (name)
Marai Parai, or Marei Parei, a plateau in Malaysia
Ulli and Marei, a 1948 Austrian drama film 
 Centre for Marine and Renewable Energy (MaREI), Irish research center

See also
Marai (disambiguation)